Elizabeth Freeman ( 1744  December 28, 1829), also known as Bet, Mum Bett, or MumBet, was the first enslaved African American to file and win a freedom suit in Massachusetts. The Massachusetts Supreme Judicial Court ruling, in Freeman's favor, found slavery to be inconsistent with the 1780 Massachusetts State Constitution. Her suit, Brom and Bett v. Ashley (1781), was cited in the Massachusetts Supreme Judicial Court appellate review of Quock Walker's freedom suit.  When the court upheld Walker's freedom under the state's constitution, the ruling was considered to have implicitly ended slavery in Massachusetts.

Biography

Freeman was illiterate and left no written records of her life. Her early history has been pieced together from the writings of contemporaries to whom she told her story or who heard it indirectly, as well as from historical records.

Freeman was born into slavery around 1744 at the farm of Pieter Hogeboom in Claverack, New York, where she was given the name Bet.  When Hogeboom's daughter Hannah married John Ashley of Sheffield, Massachusetts, Hogeboom gave Bet, around seven years old, to Hannah and her husband. Freeman remained with them until 1781, during which time she had a child, Little Bet. She is said to have married, though no marriage record has been located. Her husband (name unknown) is said to have never returned from service in the American Revolutionary War.

Throughout her life, Bet exhibited a strong spirit and sense of self. She came into conflict with Hannah Ashley, who was raised in the strict Dutch culture of the New York colony. In 1780, Bet prevented Hannah from striking a servant girl with a heated shovel; Elizabeth shielded the girl and received a deep wound in her arm. As the wound healed, Bet left it uncovered as evidence of her harsh treatment. Catharine Maria Sedgwick quotes Elizabeth saying: "Madam never again laid her hand on Lizzy. I had a bad arm all winter, but Madam had the worst of it. I never covered the wound, and when people said to me, before Madam,—'Why, Betty! what ails your arm?' I only answered —'ask missis!' Which was the slave and which was the real mistress?"

John Ashley was a Yale-educated lawyer, wealthy landowner, businessman and leader in the community. His house was the site of many political discussions and the probable location of the signing of the Sheffield Declaration, which predated the Declaration of Independence.

In 1780, Freeman either heard the newly ratified Massachusetts Constitution read at a public gathering in Sheffield, or overheard her master talking at events in the home. She heard what included the following:

Inspired by these words, Bett sought the counsel of Theodore Sedgwick, a young abolition-minded lawyer, to help her sue for freedom in court.  According to Catherine Sedgwick's account, she told him: "I heard that paper read yesterday, that says, all men are created equal, and that every man has a right to freedom. I'm not a dumb critter; won't the law give me my freedom?"  After much deliberation Sedgwick accepted her case, as well as that of Brom, another of Ashley's slaves. He enlisted the aid of Tapping Reeve, the founder of Litchfield Law School, one of America's earliest law schools, located in Litchfield, Connecticut. They were two of the top lawyers in Massachusetts, and Sedgwick later served as US Senator. Arthur Zilversmit suggests the attorneys may have selected these plaintiffs to test the status of slavery under the new state constitution.

The case of Brom and Bett v. Ashley was heard in August 1781 before the County Court of Common Pleas in Great Barrington. Sedgwick and Reeve asserted that the constitutional provision that "all men are born free and equal" effectively abolished slavery in the state. When the jury ruled in Bett's favor, she became the first African-American woman to be set free under the Massachusetts state constitution.

The jury found that "...Brom & Bett are not, nor were they at the time of the purchase of the original writ the legal Negro of the said John Ashley..." The court assessed damages of thirty shillings and awarded both plaintiffs compensation for their labor. Ashley initially appealed the decision, but a month later dropped his appeal, apparently having decided the court's ruling on constitutionality of slavery was "final and binding."

After the ruling, Bett took the name Elizabeth Freeman. Although Ashley asked her to return to his house and work for wages, she chose to work in attorney Sedgwick's household. She worked for his family until 1808 as senior servant and governess to the Sedgwick children, who called her "Mumbet". The Sedgwick children included Catharine Sedgwick, who became a well-known author and wrote an account of her governess's life. Also working at the Sedgwick household during much of this time was Agrippa Hull, a free black man who had served with rebel forces for years during the Revolutionary War.

From the time Freeman gained her freedom, she became widely recognized and in demand for her skills as a healer, midwife and nurse. After the Sedgwick children were grown, Freeman moved into her own house on Cherry Hill in Stockbridge, near her daughter, grandchildren and great grandchildren.

Death
Freeman's real age was never known, but an estimate on her tombstone puts her age at about 85. She died in December 1829 and was buried in the Sedgwick family plot in Stockbridge, Massachusetts. Freeman remains the only non-Sedgwick buried in the Sedgwick plot. They provided a tombstone, inscribed as follows:

Legacy
The decision in the 1781 case of Elizabeth Freeman was cited as precedent when the Massachusetts Supreme Judicial Court heard the appeal of Quock Walker v. Jennison later that year and upheld Walker's freedom. These cases set the legal precedents that ended slavery in Massachusetts.  Vermont had already abolished it explicitly in its constitution.

The gold bead necklace visible in the portrait of Freeman was re-made into a bracelet, and carriers her nickname. 

A celebration of Elizabeth Freeman's role in the walk to freedom from enslavement included the unveiling of a statue in her honor by the Sheffield Historical Society in August 2022.

Connection to W. E. B. Du Bois
Civil Rights leader and historian W. E. B. Du Bois claimed Freeman as his relative and wrote that she married his maternal great-grandfather, "Jack" Burghardt. However, Freeman was 20 years senior to Burghardt, and no record of such a marriage has been found. It may have been Freeman's daughter, Betsy Humphrey, who married Burghardt after her first husband, Jonah Humphrey, left the area "around 1811", and after Burghardt's first wife died (c. 1810). If so, Freeman would have been Du Bois's step-great-great-grandmother. Anecdotal evidence supports Humphrey's marrying Burghardt; a close relationship of some form is likely.

In the media and arts
 Season 1, episode 37 of the television show Liberty's Kids, titled "Born Free and Equal", is about Elizabeth Freeman. It was first aired in 2003, and in it she was voiced by Yolanda King.
 The story of Elizabeth Freeman was featured on Season 1, Episode 4, of  Finding Your Roots with Henry Louis Gates, Jr. Freeman's lawyer, Theodore Sedgwick, is the fourth great-grandfather of Kyra Sedgwick, one of the guests of the episode.
The Portuguese fiber artist Joana Vasconcelos created a large installation in Freeman's honor in 2020 entitled Valkyrie Mumbet for the MassArt Art Museum (MAAM) in Boston, MA.

See also

 American slave court cases
 List of slaves
 List of civil rights leaders
 Nathaniel Booth (slave)
 Elizabeth Key Grinstead
 Sojourner Truth

References

External links
 

1740s births
1829 deaths
Colonial American women
People of colonial Massachusetts
People of the Province of New York
African-American abolitionists
18th-century American slaves
Freedom suits in the United States
People from Berkshire County, Massachusetts
People from Claverack, New York
Race legislation in the United States
United States slavery case law
American midwives
Activists from New York (state)
Women in the American Revolution
18th-century African-American women
19th-century African-American women